Ray Harold Dunbobbin (31 March 1931 – August 1998) was a Canadian-born English actor who appeared in numerous television productions. He is perhaps best remembered as Mr Boswell in The Liver Birds and as Ralph Hardwicke in Brookside, a part he played for over 6 years.

Early life
He was born in Canada but moved to Liverpool as a child. After he left school he worked in art studios and performed in amateur dramatics. He was then asked to double for the actor Sam Kydd in a film being shot in Birkenhead.

Television appearances
His television appearances included; Bergerac, Doctor Who, How We Used to Live, Last of the Summer Wine, I Didn't Know You Cared, The Good Life and Porridge, as the lightbulb eating prisoner Evans.

Scriptwriter
He wrote scripts for television programmes including Z-Cars and for radio and stage productions. He was also an after dinner speaker and narrator.

He died of a heart attack in 1998 at the age of 67.

References

External links

1931 births
1998 deaths
English male television actors
English male film actors
Male actors from Liverpool
20th-century English male actors